Godfather is a 1991 Indian Malayalam-language action comedy drama film written and directed by Siddique–Lal. It is produced by Appachan under the banner of Swargachithra. The film stars Mukesh, N. N. Pillai, Thilakan, Innocent and Bheeman Raghu with Philomina, Kanaka, Jagadish, Siddique and K. P. A. C. Lalitha in supporting roles. A retelling of William Shakespeare's Romeo and Juliet, The film revolves around the rivalry between two families, the Anjooran and Anappara houses and the consequences faced when two members of the families fall in love.

Godfather was initially planned to be released before In Harihar Nagar (1990), however Siddique-Lal felt that the film's script was not complete, and as a result stretched production time. The film was released on 15 November 1991 to positive reviews and became a blockbuster, running for 417 days. The film was the second highest grosser of the year, only surpassed by Kilukkam. It was later remade in Telugu as Peddarikam, in Marathi as Ghayaal,  in Hindi as Hulchul, in Kannada as Pandavaru and in Odia as Love Dot Com. The movie was shot entirely in Kozhikode.

Plot
Anjooran, and his four sons Balaraman, Swaminathan, Premachandran and Ramabhadran are in severe enmity with the Anappara family. Anjooran's bitter hatred toward Anappara Achamma stems from events in the past, when the men of Anappara abducted Balaraman's fiancée and forced her to marry the eldest son of Achamma. The resulting series of events saw Anjooran's wife being killed, and him being sent to jail for avenging her by murdering Achamma's husband. Consequently, he develops a hatred toward all women, and their entry into his home is prohibited from then on.

Anjooran's youngest son Ramabhadran is a law college student. At Law college, he and his friend Mayin Kutty try all means to humiliate their classmate Malu, who is the granddaughter of Achamma. Malu gets engaged to Shyam Prasad, a young state minister, but the minister withdraws from the relation as Anjooran intervenes and threatens him of political consequences. Incensed, Achamma hatches a plan to divide Anjooran's family by having Malu seduce Ramabhadran and making him turn against his father. When Malu expresses her feelings to Ramabhadran, as per the advice of her grandmother, Mayin Kutty ideates that Ramabhadran could divide the Anappara family by seducing Malu and turning her against them. On his advice, Ramabhadran too acts as if he is in love with her. The facade soon falls and they really fall in love with each other. While wondering about ways to get his family to support this relationship, he gets to know that Swaminathan is leading a secret double life as Ramanathan, with a wife Kochammini and two children. When confronted with this information, Swaminathan promises to help unite him and Malu.

Through a turn of events, Anjooran learns of Ramabhadran's love affair and Swaminathan's deceitfulness. Consequently, they're both ostracised from the family. Over at Anappara, Achamma is shocked to know that Malu's love is not a mere act. She and her sons decide to get her married to the family's advocate's son. However, she still tries to bring her plans to fruition by sending out signals that the house is divided over the issue. To this end, she sends her sons to beg for Anjooran's help in preventing Ramabhadran from marrying Malu (a request that Anjooran approves), and approaches Ramabhadran himself assuring him of all help in doing so.

However, Achamma does not know that her youngest son Veerabhadran is sympathetic to the lovers' cause and has revealed her plan to Ramabhadran. With his help, Ramabhadran sneaks in to the marriage hall and almost marries Malu. Enraged, Achamma curses Anjooran for not being vigilant enough, exposing her duplicity. Ramabhadran then admits that he sneaked in not to marry Malu, but to foil Achamma's plan and save his father's honour. A regretful Anjooran allows the wedding of Ramabhadran and Malu to take place and welcomes both him, Swaminathan and their families back into the fold, thereby paving the way for the entry of women into his house once again.

Cast
 Mukesh as Ramabhadran, Anjooran's youngest son
 N. N. Pillai as Anjooran
 Thilakan as Balaraman, Anjooran's eldest son
 Innocent as Swaminathan / E. K. Ramanathan, Anjooran's second son
 Bheeman Raghu as Premachandran, Anjooran's third son
 Philomina as Aanappara Achamma
 Kanaka as Malu, Achamma's granddaughter and Parasuraman's daughter 
 Jagadish as Mayin Kutty, Ramabhadran's Friend
 Siddique as Veerabhadran, Achamma's youngest son
 Paravoor Bharathan as Parasuraman, Achamma's eldest son / Achamma's husband (Double Role)
 Janardhanan as Bhoominathan, Achamma's second son
 Kundara Johny as Hemachandran, Achamma's third son
 K. P. A. C. Lalitha as Kochammini Teacher, Swaminathan's wife
 Sankaradi as Achamma's advocate
 Kollam Thulasi as Anjooran's advocate
 Harisree Ashokan as Anjooran's houseboy
 Unni Mary as Omana, Hemachandran's wife
 Thodupuzha Vasanthi as Bhoominathan's wife
 Thesni Khan as Mercy, Malu's friend
 Beena Antony as Beena, Malu's friend
 Ravi Vallathol as Dr. Balakrishnan, Son of Achamma's advocate and Malu's fiancée
 Thrissur Elsy as Hostel warden
 Zeenath as Kadappuram Karthyayani
 Vinod Kozhikode as Achamma's henchman

Music

Box office
The film was a huge commercial success, becoming one among the biggest blockbusters ever in Malayalam film industry. It ran for 417 days at Sreekumar Theatre in Thiruvananthapuram alone, which still remains an unbeaten record in Malayalam film history. The film grossed ₹ 22,84,147 in 246 days from Sreekumar Theatre, Thiruvanthapuram.

Remake
The film was remade into Telugu as Peddarikam (1992). In 1993 producer N. Chandra and director Purshottam Berde remade the film into Marathi as Ghayaal. In 2004, Priyadarshan remade the film in Hindi as Hulchul. It was also remade in Kannada as Pandavaru (2006) and in Odia as Love Dot Com.

Legacy
The film ran for more than 400 days in movie theatres in Kerala. Especially the film ran for 417 days in Sree Kumar Theatre in Thiruvananthapuram.

Awards
 Kerala Film Critics Award for Best Second Actress - Philomina

References

External links
 
 Godfather at the Malayalam Movie Database

1990s Malayalam-language films
Malayalam films remade in other languages
Indian romantic drama films
Films shot in Kozhikode
1991 romantic drama films
1991 films
Films directed by Siddique–Lal